Cavarus Point (‘Nos Kavar’ \'nos ka-'var\) is the mostly ice-covered point on the south side of the entrance to Zimen Inlet and the north side of the entrance to Brentopara Inlet on Oscar II Coast in Graham Land.  It is situated on the east coast of Churchill Peninsula.  The feature is named after King Cavarus, a Celtic ruler in Thrace (3rd century BC).

Location
British mapping in 1974.

Maps
 British Antarctic Territory: Graham Land.  Scale 1:250000 topographic map.  BAS 250 Series, Sheet SQ 19-20.  London, 1974.
 Antarctic Digital Database (ADD). Scale 1:250000 topographic map of Antarctica. Scientific Committee on Antarctic Research (SCAR). Since 1993, regularly upgraded and updated.

References
 Cavarus Point. SCAR Composite Antarctic Gazetteer.
 Bulgarian Antarctic Gazetteer. Antarctic Place-names Commission. (details in Bulgarian, basic data in English)

External links
 Cavarus Point. Copernix satellite image

Headlands of Graham Land
Oscar II Coast
Bulgaria and the Antarctic